The Shasta Union Elementary School District is a school district that operates one elementary school, the Shasta Montessori Elementary School, located in the town of Shasta, California. It is a  K-8 school, with 114 students in  the 2020–21 school year. It  has a public Montessori program for grades 1–6.

The President of the School Board in September 2010, is Roger Longnecker.

References

External links

School districts in Shasta County, California